Imperial Noble Consort Shujia (14 September 1713 – 17 December 1755), of the Korean Gingiya clan which was placed into the Manchu Plain Yellow Banner after her death, was a consort of the Qianlong Emperor. She was two years his junior.
Imperial Noble Consort Shujia was also the Qing Dynasty's only imperial concubine of ethnic Korean heritage.

Life

Family background
Imperial Noble Consort Shujia's family was born into the Korean Gin clan, which surrendered to the Qing Dynasty and eventually moved to China during the Qing invasion of Joseon in 1636. Her family was very influenced by Manchurian culture and was  later moved into a Manchu banner. Her original surname Jin (Kim) was Manchufied to Gingiya.

 Father: Sanbao, served as a third rank military official in the Imperial Stables
 Three elder brothers

Kangxi's Reign (1661–1722)

Lady Jin was born on 14 September 1713, in Uiju, Joseon. Little is known about her life before she became a Mistress to Hongli, the future Qianlong Emperor.

Yongzheng's Reign (1722–1735)

It is not known when Lady Jin became a mistress to Hongli, the future Qianlong Emperor, but she did marry him before he married his Primary Consort Fuca. It is highly possible she and the Secondary Consort Gao were close friends, as their families were also very closely allied. Hongli did not seem to favor Lady Jin very much.

Qianlong's Reign (1735–1796)

Lady Jin was titled as a Noble Lady on 8 November 1735. On 23 January 1738 she was promoted to and titled as "Imperial Concubine Jia". On 21 February 1739 she gave birth to the emperor's fourth son Yongcheng. In December 1741 or January 1742 she was promoted to "Consort Jia". While holding this title Lady Jin had another two sons, Yongxuan on 31 August 1746 andYongyu on 2 August 1748 who would die prematurely on 11 June 1749, a month after Lady Jin was promoted to "Noble Consort Jia" on 20 May.
On 22 March 1752 Lady Jin had her last child, Yongxing. Lady Jin died on 17 December 1755 at 42 years old. She was promoted to Imperial Noble Consort the following day, and the day after that, she was given her final title, "Imperial Noble Consort Shujia".

Titles
 During the reign of the Kangxi Emperor (r. 1661–1722):
 Lady Jin (from 14 September 1713)
 During the reign of the Yongzheng Emperor (r. 1722–1735):
 Mistress (格格)
 During the reign of the Qianlong Emperor (r. 1735–1796):
 Noble Lady (from 8 November 1735), sixth rank consort
 Imperial Concubine Jia (from 23 January 1738), fifth rank consort
 Consort Jia (from December 1741 or January 1742), fourth rank consort
 Noble Consort Jia (from 20 May 1749), third rank consort
 Imperial Noble Consort (from 18 December 1755), second rank consort
 Imperial Noble Consort Shujia (from 19 December 1755)

Issue
 As Imperial Concubine Jia:
 Yongcheng (21 February 1739 – 5 April 1777), the Qianlong Emperor's fourth son, granted the title Prince Lü of the Second Rank in 1763, posthumously honoured as Prince Lüduan of the First Rank
 As Consort Jia:
 Yongxuan (31 August 1746 – 1 September 1832), the Qianlong Emperor's eighth son, granted the title Prince Yi of the Second Rank in 1779, elevated to Prince Yi of the First Rank in 1797, posthumously honoured as Prince Yishen of the First Rank
 Yongyu (永瑜; 2 August 1748 – 11 June 1749), The Qianlong Emperor's ninth son 
 As Noble Consort Jia:
 Yongxing (22 March 1752 – 10 May 1823), the Qianlong Emperor's 11th son, granted the title Prince Cheng of the First Rank in 1789, posthumously honoured as Prince Chengzhe of the First Rank

In fiction and popular culture
 Portrayed by Pan Shiqi in Story of Yanxi Palace (2018)
 Portrayed by Xin Zhilei in Ruyi's Royal Love in the Palace (2018)

See also
Consort Han, a Korean concubine of the Hongwu Emperor of the Ming dynasty
Empress Gi, a Korean concubine and later empress of the Yuan emperor Toghon Temür
 Ranks of imperial consorts in China
 Royal and noble ranks of the Qing dynasty

Notes

References
 

1713 births
1755 deaths
Consorts of the Qianlong Emperor
Chinese people of Korean descent
People from Uiju County